"Don't Forget Me" is the second single by Australian rock-pop band 1927's second studio album The Other Side (1990). The track was released in July 1990 and peaked at number 42 on the ARIA singles chart.

Track listing
CD single / 7" 

CD maxi / 12"

Charts

References

1927 (band) songs
1990 songs
1990 singles
Warner Music Group singles